Gloria Osei Sarfo is a Ghanaian actress and TV presenter. She won Best Supporting Actress  Award at the 2020 Africa Magic Viewers' Choice Awards for her role in Shirley Frimping Manso's The Perfect Picture - Ten Years Later.

Career 
Sarfo began her acting career in the mid-2000s, starring in Revele Films' Hotel Saint James. She gained popularity after playing the role of Nana Ama in Efiewura.

Awards 
Sarfo won Best Supporting Actress at the 2020 Africa Magic Viewers' Choice Awards.

Filmography 

 Friday Night (2008) 
 Friday Night 2 (2008)
 The Most Beautiful Hour (2012) 
 Efiewura
 Akwaaba (film)
 Living with Trisha
 The Perfect Picture - Ten Years Later
 Somewhere in Africa
 Aloe Vera (2020)

References

Living people
Ghanaian actresses
21st-century Ghanaian actresses
Year of birth missing (living people)